Sigara striata is a species of water boatman in the family Corixidae in the order Hemiptera.

References

Insects described in 1758
Taxa named by Carl Linnaeus
Sigara